A self-driving truck, also known as an autonomous truck, or robo-truck is an application of self-driving car designed to transport cargo without requiring a human driver. Many companies are testing self-driving semi trucks.

In September 2022, Guidehouse Insights listed Waymo, Aurora, TuSimple, Gatik, PlusAI, Kodiak Robotics, Daimler Truck, Einride, Locomation, and Embark as the top 10 vendors in automated trucking. 
And, Transport Topics in November 2022 is listing fourteen companies to know about self-driving truck; Aurora, Waymo, TuSimple, Gatik, Locomation, Torc Robotics, Waabi, Einride, PlusAI, Embark, Kodiak Robotics, Robotic Research, Outrider and Pronto.

Perspectives 
Market
According to Allied Market Research, the global self-driving truck market may have generated as much as $1 billion in revenue in 2020, and is projected to reach the market size of $1,669 million by 2025, growing at a compound annual growth rate of 10.4 percent from 2020 to 2025.

Employment
Economists and policy makers are concerned about the effects of automation and artificial intelligence on employment including whether some kinds of jobs will cease to exist at all, and trucking is the most concerned job. However, Karen Levy is on the view that the path to fully autonomous trucking is likely to be a gradual slope due to social, legal, and cultural factors.

Defense and dual-use technology
In December 2022, the Army partnered with the Defense Innovation Unit (DIU) to prototype a software package, as well as a process to adapt self-driving vehicle technology. The Ground Vehicle Autonomous Pathways project will prototype software for the navigation of uncrewed vehicles by fusing data from multiple sensors and allowing teleoperations of unmanned ground vehicles.
Self-driving trucking technology company Kodiak Robotics won the contract to test and deploy autonomous software that can navigate complex, off-road terrain, diverse operational conditions and GPS-challenged environments. DIU is leveraging this partnership to build a pipeline between the commercial and military deployment of self-driving vehicle technologies that will reduce the risk to troops in war zones.

History

The 1990s 
As recorded in June 1995 in Popular Science Magazine, self-driving trucks were being developed for combat convoys, whereby only the lead truck would be driven by a human and the following trucks would rely on satellite navigation, an inertial guidance system and ground-speed sensors.

Komatsu made the earliest development in autonomous trucks testing a fleet of five Ultra Class trucks in Codelco Mine Radomiro Tomic in Chile in 2005 then in 2007 was installed the first working fleet in the mine Gabriela Mistral in Chile, also a Codelco property.

The 2010s 

Lockheed Martin, with funding from the U.S. Army, developed an autonomous truck convoy system that uses a lead truck operated by a human driver with a number of trucks following autonomously.

In Europe, truck platooning was being considered with the Safe Road Trains for the Environment approach, a project that ended in September 2012.

Caterpillar Inc. made early developments in 2013 with the Robotics Institute at Carnegie Mellon University to improve efficiency and reduce cost at various mining and construction sites. Companies such as Codelco Chilean State Mining Company, Suncor Energy (a Canadian energy company), and Rio Tinto Group were among the first to replace human-operated trucks with driver-less commercial trucks run by computers.

2016

Otto demonstrated its self-driving trucks on the highway before being acquired by Uber in August 2016. In May 2017, San Francisco-based startup Embark announced a partnership with truck manufacturer Peterbilt to test and deploy autonomous technology in Peterbilt's vehicles. Waymo stated it was also testing autonomous technology in trucks, however no timeline has been given for the project.

In April 2016, trucks from major manufacturers including Volvo and Daimler completed a week of autonomous driving across Europe, organized by the Netherlands, in an effort to get self-driving trucks on the road. Volvo has also developed its own autonomous trucks, called Vera.

In 2016, Anheuser-Busch and Uber partnered and made the first commercial delivery of beer over  using a self-driving truck, with a human in the truck, but not behind the wheel.  Waymo also delivered freight in Atlanta, Georgia.

2018

In February 2018, Starsky Robotics, the San Francisco-based autonomous truck company, completed a  driver-less trip in Florida without a human in the truck, though one was available to take over by remote control. Starsky Robotics claimed to be the first self-driving truck company to drive on a public road without a person in the cab.

In July 2018, Uber announced it was shuttering the truck-focused branch of its autonomous vehicles program as part of a reorganization of its Advanced Technologies Group following the fatal Uber autonomous passenger vehicle crash in Tempe, Arizona in March 2018. Shortly after Uber shut down its autonomous truck efforts, two autonomous truck startups, Kodiak Robotics and Ike, announced they had hired employees from the Uber program.

In September 2018, Ford unveiled its own vision of the heavy-duty truck of the future as the F-Vision semi concept which will be a SAE Level 4 autonomous vehicle.

In November 2018, Embark Trucks announced a pilot with national truck fleet Ryder and Frigidaire to deliver refrigerators via autonomous trucks from El Paso, Texas to Palm Springs, California.

2019

In March 2019, Daimler AG through its subsidiary Daimler Truck North America announced that it would acquire a majority stake in Torc Robotics for an undisclosed amount as part of its Highly Automated Truck Program.

In May 2019, the company TuSimple announced a contract for a two-week pilot delivering mail for the United States Postal Service. The company planned to run five round trips between Dallas, Texas and Phoenix, Arizona, with two humans on board. The company runs daily cargo for customers in Arizona.

Unable to raise additional funding, Starsky shut down operations on March 19, 2020.

In December 2019, Plus conducted the industry's first cross-country commercial freight run using a self-driving truck, carrying  of butter  from Tulare, California to Quakertown, Pennsylvania for Land O'Lakes.

The 2020s 
2020
In March 2020, the company TuSimple expanded its freight-hauling pilot program with the United Parcel Service (UPS) to run 20 trips per week hauling cargo between Phoenix and Tucson, Arizona, and between Phoenix and El Paso, Texas.
Also in March 2020, Waymo announced the official launch of Waymo Via, which includes the use of autonomous Class 8 trucks for delivery.

In July 2020, Locomation completed a two-week pilot with Wilson Logistics where Locomation trucks hauled commercial cargo between Portland, Oregon and Nampa, Idaho over Interstate 84.
Also in July 2020, Aurora opened an office in Texas to expand testing of self-driving trucks with commercial routes in the Dallas-Fort Worth area by the end of the year.

In September 2020, Daimler Trucks and Torc Robotics opened a test center in Albuquerque, New Mexico, testing automated vehicle runs on New Mexico highways.

2021
In December 2021, TuSimple completed its first autonomous truck run on open public roads, 80-mile  between a railyard in Tuscon, Arizona and a distribution center in Phoenix.

2022
An amendment to the UNECE's regulation on Automated Lane Keeping Systems for their use in heavy vehicles including trucks, buses and coaches is expected to enter into force in June 2022 in the 54 Contracting Parties to the 1958 Agreement, which already apply UNECE's regulation 157.

Torc Robotics opened an engineering office in Austin, Texas, and a Technology and Development Center in Stuttgart, Germany. The company also announced that Penske Truck Leasing would serve as the truck maintenance service provider for Torc's autonomous test fleet.

In June 2022, Einride received approval to operate its vehicles on the U.S. roads.

In October 2022, TuSimple's CEO, Chief Technology Officer, and co-founder, Xiaodi Hou, was fired by the company's board, which cited a "loss in trust and confidence" in Hou's judgment in connection with an alleged sharing of confidential information with a Chinese company, Hydron Inc.
The FBI, the SEC, and CFIUS are investigating TuSimple on suspicions of illicit technology transfer to Hydron in China.

In December 2022, Kodiak Robotics won the contract with Defense Innovation Unit (DIU) to prototype  autonomous software that can navigate complex, off-road terrain, diverse operational conditions and GPS-challenged environments. DIU is leveraging this partnership to build a pipeline between the commercial and military deployment of self-driving vehicle technologies that will reduce the risk to troops in war zones.

See also
 Self-driving car

References

Trucks

Automotive technologies
Emerging technologies